Area code 863 is the telephone area code in Florida which covers the Heartland, as well as Polk County in Central Florida. Some of the larger and more notable cities in the 863 area code include Lakeland, Bartow, Winter Haven, Lake Wales, Sebring, Clewiston, Avon Park, Arcadia, Poinciana and Okeechobee City.

Description
Area code 863 covers the total area of the following counties: Polk, Hardee, Highlands, Glades,  and Hendry. Almost the entire area of De Soto and Okeechobee counties are in the 863 area code as well. Tiny areas of Hillsborough and St. Lucie counties are also in the 863 area.  Area code 863 is also Florida's first land-locked area code (not counting the northwest portion of area code 386).

History
The region belonging to area code 863 used to be part of area code 305, which covered the entire state of Florida. In 1953, the southwest Florida coast was split off into area code 813, while all of north Florida was split off into the area code 904 in 1965, and the southeast portion retained 305. The 813 area code was untouched for 43 years until 1996 when the 13 counties outside of the immediate Tampa Bay area (all but Hillsborough, Pinellas, and Pasco counties) were given the area code 941. In 1999, the 863 area code took its current form as the coastal counties of the 941 area code kept 941, while the rest were given the new 863 area code.

See also
List of Florida area codes
List of NANP area codes
North American Numbering Plan

References

Florida's Area Code History

External links

List of exchanges from AreaCodeDownload.com, 863 Area Code

863
863
1999 establishments in Florida